Socket G3 may refer to:

 AMD Socket G3
 Intel Socket G3

See also
 CPU socket